The Thompson House is a historic house in rural northern White County, Arkansas, USA. The house is a vernacular single story ell-shaped wood-frame structure, with a gabled roof, weatherboard siding and a foundation of stone piers. Built about 1890, it is one of the few houses in White County to survive from that time, and was reported to be in declining condition when it was listed on the National Register of Historic Places in 1992.

See also
National Register of Historic Places listings in White County, Arkansas

References

Houses on the National Register of Historic Places in Arkansas
Houses completed in 1890
Houses in White County, Arkansas
National Register of Historic Places in White County, Arkansas
1890 establishments in Arkansas